Lonesome Ghosts is a 1937 Disney animated cartoon, released through RKO Radio Pictures on December 24, 1937, three days after Snow White and the Seven Dwarfs (1937). It was directed by Burt Gillett and animated by Izzy (Isadore) Klein, Ed Love, Milt Kahl, Marvin Woodward, Bob Wickersham, Clyde Geronimi, Dick Huemer, Dick Williams, Art Babbitt, and Rex Cox. The short features Mickey Mouse, Donald Duck & Goofy as members of The Ajax Ghost Exterminators. It was the 98th short in the Mickey Mouse film series to be released, and the ninth for that year.

This short marked the first use of one of Goofy's catchphrases, "Somethin' wrong here!".

Plot
The Ajax Ghost Exterminators - Mickey, Donald & Goofy - are hired by telephone to drive out four ghosts from a haunted house that has long been abandoned. Unbeknownst to them, however, they were called by the ghosts themselves, who are bored because nobody has visited the house for a long time (either because none of the locals were scared or they had scared them all away, as one ghost puts it: "Guess we're too good!"). They wish to play tricks on the living and do so through a series of inventive, annoying pranks.

The exterminators arrive and knock on the front door, which falls down. When they announce themselves, there is nobody to receive them. Mickey decides they should get to work anyway. When entering, the door lifts up and throws them inside before putting itself back in place, making a rat trap fall shut on Goofy's nose. After hearing the ghosts' laughter, the three split up to hunt the ghosts individually.

The exterminators are toyed with at every turn; a ghost knocks Mickey on the head and puts its fingers in both barrels of his shotgun when he tries to shoot it and it explodes. Mickey is driven upstairs and tries to open a door that the ghost disappears into, which falls down and the ghosts (forming a marching band) come out of the fallen door and go into another. 

Mickey opens the door, which causes water to pour out of it while the ghosts surf across it on surfboards. The last one comes out on a motorboat that goes in a circle around Mickey until it and the water disappear altogether. 

Donald, meanwhile, is whacked in the rear with a wooden board and is scared away by the sounds of banging chains and dishes. He punches the ghost, but it resurfaces and blows water in his face. 

Goofy runs into a bedroom at the sound of a ghost banging a wooden spoon on a pan. He soon becomes tangled in a dresser after seeing a ghost in a mirror instead of his reflection and stabs his rear with a pin, mistaking his blue pants for a ghost, and is shoved down into the basement.

In the end, the three exterminators crash into some molasses, flour and syrup, making them look like ghosts and consequently, they scare the actual ghosts out of the house in a panic, knocking off and smashing objects through the whole interior (tableware, books, furniture, couches, vinyl records, a lamp). The ghost hunters stand victorious, having driven the spirits out of the house, although not exactly certain how. Donald smugly assumes the ghosts fled in capitulation to their superior tactics, calling them sissies and laughing.

Voice cast
Mickey Mouse: Walt Disney
Donald Duck: Clarence Nash
Goofy: Pinto Colvig
Short Ghost: Billy Bletcher
Other ghosts: Don Brodie, Jack Bergman, Harry Stanton

Releases
1937 – theatrical release
1954 – Disneyland, episode #1.1: "The Disneyland Story" (TV)
1963 – theatrical re-release with The Sword in The Stone
1968 – Walt Disney's Wonderful World of Color, episode #15.11: "The Mickey Mouse Anniversary Show" (TV)
c. 1972 – The Mouse Factory, episode #5: "Spooks and Magic" (TV)
c. 1977 – The Wonderful World of Disney episode #5: "Halloween Hall o' Fame" (TV)
c. 1983 – Good Morning, Mickey!, episode #79 (TV)
1983 – A Disney Halloween (TV)
c. 1997 – The Ink and Paint Club, episode #22: "Classic Mickey" (TV)
c. 1998 – The Ink and Paint Club, episode #55: "Oooh! Scary!" (TV)
2009 – Have a Laugh!, episode #1 (TV)
2010 – 13 Nights of Halloween

Home media
The short was released on December 4, 2001, on Walt Disney Treasures: Mickey Mouse in Living Color.

Additional releases include:
1982 – Bonus on The Legend of Sleepy Hollow (VHS)
1989 – Cartoon Classics: Halloween Haunts (VHS)
2000 – Bonus on The Adventures of Ichabod and Mr. Toad (DVD)
2002 – Mickey's House of Villains (DVD)
2010 – Have a Laugh! Volume One" (DVD)
2019 – Disney+ release

In other media
An edited (and silent) version of the cartoon was released as a cartridge for the Fisher-Price Movie Viewer, a small crank-operated toy.
In 1957, the scream sound effect heard at the beginning of this short was used in the fourth episode of Zorro, "The Ghost of the Mission", which appropriately aired on Halloween.
Many people believe this cartoon was the inspiration for Ghostbusters. Also, the phrase "I ain't scared of no ghost" occurs in this cartoon, which may have inspired the Ghostbusters theme song written by Ray Parker Jr. Fittingly, Disney made a D-TV of the song to footage from the cartoon for their Halloween special DTV Monster Hits.
The Lonesome Ghosts appear as helpers in the video game Disney's Magical Quest 2 Starring Mickey & Minnie.
Lonesome Ghosts was the basis for, and title of the fourth level in the video game Mickey Mania: The Timeless Adventures of Mickey Mouse, and its PlayStation version, Mickey's Wild Adventure.
A scene from Lonesome Ghosts with new music appears in Disney's Magical Mirror Starring Mickey Mouse.
A shortened version aired on the Disney Channel in October 2009, as part of a show called Disney Have-a-Laugh, which featured remastered and redubbed versions of old cartoons.
There is a travel map in the video game Epic Mickey based on this cartoon. The Lonesome Ghosts appear as Wasteland denizens and are named Gilbert, Ian, Gabriel, and Screechin' Sam.
The Lonesome Ghosts and The Ajax Ghost Exterminators were incorporated into a painting by artist Randy Souders. Entitled "A Haunting We Will Go", it was created for the 1997 Disneyana Convention at Walt Disney World.
In the "House Ghosts" episode of Disney's House Of Mouse, The Lonesome Ghosts make a cameo, scaring Pete and pulling his underwear making him naked.
Lonesome Ghosts also appeared in an episode of Sing Me a Story with Belle.
The ghosts make a cameo in the TV series Bonkers.
In the "Houseghosts" episode of The Wonderful World of Mickey Mouse, The Lonesome Ghosts appear to take advantage of Mickey's kindness and moved into his house after their house was torn down and become homeless for scaring the entire neighborhood.
A snippet was used telling about New Year's superstitions near the end of Disney's Wonderful World of Winter 1983 educational short.

See also
List of ghost films
Mickey Mouse (film series)

References

External links
Lonesome Ghosts at The Internet Animation Database

1937 films
1937 animated films
1937 comedy films
1937 short films
1930s Disney animated short films
1930s comedy horror films
1930s color films
1930s ghost films
Mickey Mouse short films
Donald Duck short films
American haunted house films
Films directed by Burt Gillett
Films produced by Walt Disney
American comedy horror films
1930s American films
1930s English-language films